Damerau is a surname. Notable people with the surname include:

Dietmar Damerau (1935–2011), German artist
Frederick J. Damerau (1931–2009), American researcher on natural language processing and data mining
Damerau–Levenshtein distance